Pagnier is a French surname. Notable people with the surname include:

 Joséphine Pagnier (born 2002), French ski jumper
 Marie-France Pagnier (born  1945), French diplomat

French-language surnames